The Council of Ministers of Lebanon, known informally as the Cabinet of Lebanon, is the chief executive body of the Republic of Lebanon.

October 2004 cabinet

July 2005 cabinet

The July 2005, Lebanese cabinet was formed by Fouad Siniora on 19 July 2005 who was appointed by then president Émile Lahoud. All the main political blocs were included in it except for the Free Patriotic Movement-led bloc headed by General Michel Aoun. On 24 November 2007, the government became an interim one following the end of the president's mandate.

July 2008 cabinet

The July 2008 Lebanese cabinet was formed by Fouad Siniora on 11 July 2008.

November 2009 cabinet

In November 2009, after five months of negotiations following the 2009 parliamentary elections, Lebanese prime minister Saad Hariri formed a national unity government.

June 2011 cabinet

On 13 June 2011, after five months of negotiations following the designation of Najib Mikati as prime minister, he formed a new government.

February 2014 cabinet

December 2016 cabinet
The December 2016 cabinet was formed by prime minister Saad Harriri, appointed by President Michel Aoun. The government was the first in the President's term. It was considered resigned in May 2018 after the parliamentary elections.

January 2019 cabinet
The January 2019 cabinet was formed by prime minister Saad Harriri, re-appointed by President Michel Aoun following the May 2018 parliamentary elections. The government took nine months to form, as the prime minister has to reconcile various political factions in a national unity government.'

January 2020 cabinet

The January 2020 cabinet was formed by prime minister Hassan Diab, appointed by President Michel Aoun in reaction to the resignation of Prime Minister Saad Hariri on 29 October 2019. See also 2019-2020 Lebanese protests.

September 2021 cabinet 

A new government was formed by Najib Mikati on the 10th of September 2021 after a 13-month-long wait for a new cabinet.

Full List with articles to contribute to

References

Government of Lebanon
Lebanon